The Grand Marshal, or GM, is the highest elected student leader of Rensselaer Polytechnic Institute. The position has been in existence since shortly after the American Civil War.

Article V, Section II of the Rensselaer Union Constitution, defines the position Grand Marshal and establishes this position as the presiding officer of the Student Senate and an ex officio member of all committees and role as the leader and the chief spokesperson for the entire Union.

Powers and duties 
The Grand Marshal is normally a nonvoting member of the Student Senate. However, in the event of a tie, the Grand Marshal may cast one vote. The Grand Marshal has the power to appoint student representatives. However, any appointments made may be nullified by a majority vote of the entire Student Senate membership.

The Grand Marshal serves on Institute committees as representative of the student body, and meets with the President and Board of Trustees to represent student interests.

History
The position of Grand Marshal was created in 1866 to honor a student respected and admired by his classmates. Major Albert Metcalf Harper of Delta Phi was elected and presented a ceremonial sword, as was fitting for a major during the Civil War. His function was to head and represent the entire student body on all occasions in all relations, thereby giving it a formal unity. Except for a few years during the 1890s, Grand Marshals were elected each year, usually in the spring, and this provided, as it were, the culminating event of the student calendar with celebrations of the Grand Marshal's election and installation.

The election customs were well established by 1882, when Independence Grove, a strangely named junior, of Chi Phi, was elected Grand Marshal. In 1883 occurred a characteristic Grand Marshal's election night on May 26. William A. Aycrigg was chosen without opposition in Harmony Hall, used for many years for the purpose, and the retiring marshal was presented with a suitably inscribed gold-headed cane. The students then filed into the streets and, headed by Doring's Band, paraded through the city, with Greek fire displays and houses illuminated. They stopped at Boughton's hat store, where the new marshal was presented with a high silk hat, still used symbolically as the headgear of the office.

A common practice of the student parade was to serenade the students of the Emma Willard School, located in downtown, as well as some of the professors and school dignitaries at their homes, and they generally responded with speeches of acknowledgment. At about eleven at night the parade returned to Harmony Hall for food, drink and dancing. Until the wee hours of the morning, the press reported, the shouts and plaudits could be heard for blocks on the still night air. In 1883 the total expenses of the election were $212.50, raised by class assessments, and they included $28 for the hall and damages to it, $127 for the music, and $12 for the services of the 8 policemen at the hall.

The political order on the postwar Rensselaer campus was also transmitted from the past and continued to function despite discontent and the desire for reform. The Student Union as an association of all students had its roots in the nineteenth century, although its modern and formal organization dated from 1908. Its two heads, one the Grand Marshal, and the other, president of the Union, carried great prestige, and harked back to the nineteenth century. They were the occasion for an annual student campaign, election, and celebration which were encrusted with tradition and lively youthful antics. On these foundations was erected in due course a broad system of student elections, comprising class officers and members of the Student Council, in which the fraternities almost from the first played a prominent, if not dominant, role. The spring week of hectic campaigning and voting culminated in the celebration of Grand Marshal's Night. How genuinely democratic this election system is can be debated, but it has persisted as the one unifying, all-Institute event, accompanied by the frenzied excitement of electioneering characteristic of American politics generally and caricatured by the exploits and ebullience of youth.

The election of the grand marshal has undergone many changes since the position was created in 1865. In the 1880s the GM was elected by a "caucus" of students at a location off campus in an environment that might not have been conducive to intelligent voting. These 1886 Transit illustrations indicate that the process was reformed. Institute regulations, city and state laws, and changes in society have continued to modify election events. In spite of change, Rensselaer alumni share fond memories of these GM nights, days, or weeks, whether they were held on or off campus and with of without certain beverages of entertainment.

GM Week celebrations
Today, a special committee plans the "GM week" events, which occur in the last week of March. The week kicks off with events in the Armory; in the past these have included twister, miniature golf, rock climbing, a pie eating contests, and laser tag. Then there are dozens of events each day of the week, hosted by various clubs and fraternities. Events usually include battle of the bands style concerts, tennis and volleyball tournaments, fireworks, and engineering contests such as an egg drop competition from the top of the JEC. At the end of the week, the final induction ceremony is often held in the Houston Field House.

Grand Marshals
There have been 156 Grand Marshals in the history of Rensselaer Polytechnic Institute. Cait Bennett ’22 was elected Grand Marshal during Grand Marshal Week 2022 and is currently serving for the 2022-23 term. Bennett is the first two-term Grand Marshal elected in the history of the position.

References

External links
GM Week Website

Rensselaer Polytechnic Institute